The Treaty of Berlin (1889) (also known as the Samoan Treaty) was the concluding document of the conference at Berlin in 1889 on Samoa. The conference was proposed by German foreign minister Count Herbert von Bismarck (son of chancellor Otto von Bismarck) to reconvene the adjourned Washington conference on Samoa of 1887. Herbert von Bismarck invited delegations from the United States and the British Empire to Berlin in April 1889.

The treaty launched the condominium in Samoa between the United States, Germany and Great Britain.  It was designed to guarantee the preservation of rights of the three powers as secured in separate treaties with the Samoan régime in 1878 and 1879. Further, the independence and neutrality of the Samoan government was ensured, public finance was reorganized and the Samoan king elected in 1881 was restored.   

The treaty established a court and the position of a "Chief Justice of Samoa" who would be appointed by all three powers. If they could not reach an agreement on the appointment, the position would be appointed by the King of Sweden. In an effort to strengthen the judiciary an American/European chief justice position was created, and the municipality of Apia was reestablished, chaired by a council president.  

The treaty was signed at Berlin by the three powers on 14 June 1889. It was ratified by the U.S. Senate on February 3, 1890. Ratifications were exchanged on 12 April 1890 and assented to by the Samoan government on 19 April 1890, in effect four governments were party to the Berlin Act.

The condominium ended in political shambles after ten years with the ratification of the Tripartite Convention of 1899 and the resulting partition of the Samoan archipelago.

See also
List of treaties

Further reading

Gilson, Richard Phillip.  Samoa 1830 to 1900, The Politics of a Multi-Cultural Community. Melbourne: Oxford University Press. 1970.
Ryden, George Herbert.  The Foreign Policy of the United States in Relation to Samoa.  New York: Octagon Press. 1975.  (Reprint by special arrangement with Yale University Press.  Originally published at New Haven: Yale University Press. 1928)

External links
WHKMLA: History of Samoa, 1830-1899

References

Berlin (1889)
Berlin (1889)
History of Samoa
European colonisation in Oceania
1889 treaties
Berlin (1889)
British colonisation of Oceania